On Location: George Carlin at USC (aka An Evening with George Carlin at USC) is American comedian George Carlin's first ever HBO special, recorded March 5, 1977, at the University of Southern California in Los Angeles. This unique taping lasted 85 minutes. He had also explained to the audience that before this special came about, that he never did a show for home consumption or reproduction.

In the process of planning this broadcast, the word spread quickly, and so much so that it resulted in a serious legal hearing at the Federal Communications Commission. Due to the controversy, Carlin sticks with more user-friendly material.

However, a federal court of appeals ruled in Carlin's favor and allowed him his right to free speech. This was mentioned during the opening of the program by Newsweek columnist Shana Alexander, which explained that it is the kind of entertainment that was rarely seen or heard on cable or network television at the time. Also, nearing the end of the taping, the video freezes and a message appears for the sense of responsibility. That message reads: 

For that segment was wholly based on the "Seven Dirty Words". He also mentioned that the many ways of referring to these words outnumbered the actual few words that existed.

Program 

 Intro & Warning (1:40)
 Program Open (:36)
 Personal Memories (2:22)
 Taking The Stage (10:27)
 Shopping (7:52)
 Walking (3:59)
 Dogs & Cats (9:27)
 Old Folks & Kids (8:00)
 Food (3:30)
 The News (3:20)
 Brand Names
 Perversion of Language
 Forbidden Words (23:24)
 Closing Credits (1:47)

See also

 Home Box Office
 On Location (TV series)
 Federal Communications Commission
 University of Southern California
 Seven dirty words
 Newsweek
 Shana Alexander (1925-2005)

References

External links

George Carlin
1970s American television specials
HBO network specials
Stand-up comedy concert films
1977 television specials
Television shows directed by Marty Callner
1970s in comedy